Silvia Costa may refer to:

 Silvia Costa (athlete) (born 1964), Cuban high jumper 
 Silvia Costa (politician) (born 1949), Italian journalist and politician